A1 Team Netherlands was the Dutch team of A1 Grand Prix, an international racing series.

Management 
A1 Team Netherlands' owner was former Formula One driver and Le Mans winner Jan Lammers. The team was managed by Lammers's racing team Racing for Holland, notable for their participation in the 24 hours of Le Mans and FIA sportscars series.

History 
The 2005-06 season had a difficult start for Team Netherlands. In the first two sprint races the car was hit in the first turn on both the Brands Hatch and EuroSpeedway circuits. Despite these setbacks, Jos Verstappen showed impressive overtaking action in the main races moving from the back of the grid to the seventh position. The season continued with average results, with 4th up to 19th positions as end results.

The street circuit of Durban, South Africa brought the first victory for A1 Team Netherlands as in the last turn of the main race, Jos Verstappen managed to take the lead from the Swiss car. A similar manoeuvre that failed during the sprint race forced Verstappen to start from the 16th place on the grid.

In 2006-07 Team Netherlands finished 5th in the championship, with one victory.

In 2007-08 Team Netherlands finished 7th in the championship, with 2 podiums.

For the 2008-09 season Jeroen Bleekemolen returned as a driver, alongside A1GP rookie Robert Doornbos. Both drivers alternated races, starting with Bleekemolen at Zandvoort. Team Netherlands finished 4th in the championship, with both drivers having scored one victory in a sprint race.

Drivers

Complete A1 Grand Prix results 
(key), "spr" indicates the Sprint Race, "fea" indicates the Feature Race.(results in bold indicate pole position; results in italics indicate fastest lap)

References

External links 

A1gp.com Official A1 Grand Prix Web Site
Official Team Website - A1 Team Netherlands
Racing for Holland, homepage of the management team
A1GP Team Netherlands Photosite

Netherlands
Dutch auto racing teams
National sports teams of the Netherlands
Auto racing teams established in 2005
Auto racing teams disestablished in 2009